Chalice Hymnal may refer to:

 An English-language hymnal of the Christian Church (Disciples of Christ)
 Chalice Hymnal (album), by Grails, 2017